Yevgeni Valeryevich Kharlachyov (born 20 January 1974) is a Russian football coach and a former player. He is the manager of FC Sokol Saratov.

Honours
 Russian Premier League runner-up: 1995, 1999, 2000.
 Russian Premier League bronze: 1994, 1998.
 Russian Cup winner: 1996, 1997, 2000, 2001.
 Russian Cup runner-up: 1998.
 Top 33 players year-end list: 1994, 1995, 1996, 1999.

International career
Kharlachyov made his debut for Russia on 28 August 1996 in a friendly against Brazil. He played in the qualifiers for 1998 FIFA World Cup.

References
  Profile

1974 births
Living people
Russian footballers
Association football midfielders
Russia youth international footballers
Russia under-21 international footballers
Russia international footballers
PFC Krylia Sovetov Samara players
FC Lokomotiv Moscow players
FC Dynamo Moscow players
FC Saturn Ramenskoye players
FC Baltika Kaliningrad players
FC Lada-Tolyatti players
Russian Premier League players
Russian football managers
FC Sokol Saratov managers
Sportspeople from Tolyatti